FC Khimik Chernihiv was a Ukrainian football "Khimik" Chernihiv. A Ukrainian and Soviet amateur club, the club played in the Championship and Cup of Chernihiv region and the Championship of the USSR among CPK. The club played at a stadium of the same name.

History
Khimik was established sometime in 1950s in Chernihiv as a factory team of chemical factory "Khimvolokno" during the Soviet period (Ukrainian SSR) and it remains the team with a record number of the most Chernihiv Oblast Football Championship titles.

The team got third in Ukrainian Amateur Football Championship  in 1970 in 1975. In 1976, the team won the Ukrainian Amateur Football Championship and produced players like Yuriy Hruznov, Andriy Protsko, Ihor Bobovych and Yukhym Shkolnykov.

In 1977 was taken its roots in order to revived Desna Chernihiv the main team in Chernihiv. Anyway, the team won the Chernihiv Oblast Football Championship in 1985, 1986,1987, 1991 and 1993, The team won also the Chernihiv Oblast Football Cup in 1985 and 1988.

Facilities & Venue
The team played in Khimik Sports Complex, Chernihiv, next to the Cheksil factory 2–3 km by the Chernihiv Ovruch railway and the Monument to Soldiers Liberators in Victory Square.

Honours
Ukrainian Amateur Football Championship
 Winners (1): 1976
 Third place (2):, 1970, 1975
Chernihiv Oblast Football Championship
 Winners (15): 1967, 1968, 1969, 1970, 1971, 1972, 1973, 1974, 1975, 1976, 1985, 1986, 1987, 1991, 1993

Chernihiv Oblast Football Cup
 Winners (10): 1966, 1967, 1968, 1969, 1970, 1974, 1975, 1985, 1988

Notable players
  Yuriy Hruznov
  Andriy Protsko
  Yukhym Shkolnykov
  Ihor Bobovych
  Victor Lazarenko
  Mikhail Chabaida
  Oleh Ivashchenko

See also
 List of sport teams in Chernihiv
 FC Desna Chernihiv
 FC Desna-2 Chernihiv
 FC Desna-3 Chernihiv
 SDYuShOR Desna
 Yunist Chernihiv
 Yunist ShVSM
 Lehenda Chernihiv

References

External links

Football clubs in Chernihiv
Football clubs in Chernihiv Oblast
Defunct football clubs in Ukraine
Association football clubs established in 1950
Association football clubs disestablished in 1993
1950 establishments in Ukraine
1993 disestablishments in Ukraine